The manguerito (or charanguito manguero) is a stringed instrument, a variant of the Andean charango, invented by Ernesto Cavour from La Paz, Bolivia. The instrument was intended to be small enough to be carried and hidden in one's sleeves, thus the term. It has 7 nylon strings in 5 courses and is tuned D4, G4, B4 B3, E4, B4 B4.

External links
 The Stringed Instrument Database
 Cuerdas, Pacoweb.net

References

Charangos
Bolivian musical instruments